The Canton of Darney is a rural French administrative and electoral grouping of communes in the Vosges département of eastern France and in the region of Grand Est. The Canton of Darney has its administrative centre at Darney.

Composition
At the French canton reorganisation which came into effect in March 2015, the canton was expanded from 21 to 82 communes (2 of which were merged into the new commune Tollaincourt):

Les Ableuvenettes
Ahéville
Ainvelle
Ameuvelle
Attigny
Bainville-aux-Saules
Bazegney
Begnécourt
Belmont-lès-Darney
Belrupt
Bleurville
Blevaincourt
Bocquegney
Bonvillet
Bouzemont
Châtillon-sur-Saône
Circourt
Claudon
Damas-et-Bettegney
Damblain
Darney
Dombasle-devant-Darney
Dommartin-aux-Bois
Dommartin-lès-Vallois
Dompaire
Escles
Esley
Fignévelle
Fouchécourt
Frain
Frénois
Gelvécourt-et-Adompt
Gignéville
Girancourt
Godoncourt
Gorhey
Grignoncourt
Hagécourt
Harol
Hennecourt
Hennezel
Isches
Jésonville
Lamarche
Légéville-et-Bonfays
Lerrain
Lironcourt
Madonne-et-Lamerey
Marey
Maroncourt
Martigny-les-Bains
Martinvelle
Mont-lès-Lamarche
Monthureux-sur-Saône
Morizécourt
Nonville
Pierrefitte
Pont-lès-Bonfays
Provenchères-lès-Darney
Racécourt
Regnévelle
Relanges
Robécourt
Romain-aux-Bois
Rozières-sur-Mouzon
Saint-Baslemont
Saint-Julien
Sans-Vallois
Senaide
Senonges
Serécourt
Serocourt
Les Thons
Tignécourt
Tollaincourt
Les Vallois 
Vaubexy
Velotte-et-Tatignécourt
Ville-sur-Illon
Villotte
Viviers-le-Gras

References

Darney